Michael Battistini (born 8 October 1996), is a Sammarinese footballer who currently plays as a right back for Tre Penne.

International career
Battistini has represented San Marino at under 17, 19, 21 and senior level. He made his full international debut in a 2-0 loss to Moldova, coming on as a substitute for Luca Tosi.

He also represented a San Marino XI at the 2017 UEFA Regions' Cup, scoring in a 4-0 win over South Wales.

Career statistics

Club

Notes

International

References

Sammarinese footballers
San Marino international footballers
Sammarinese expatriate footballers
Association football defenders
A.S.D. Victor San Marino players
A.C. Juvenes/Dogana players
Sammarinese expatriate sportspeople in Italy
Expatriate footballers in Italy
Campionato Sammarinese di Calcio players
1996 births
Living people